This is a list of the Italy national football team's unofficial results from their inception to the present day that are not accorded the status of official internationals, not being recognized by FIFA. Player appearances and goals in these matches are also not counted to their totals.

Exhibition (unofficial) matches

1912

1913

1915

1917

1919 Inter-Allied Games 
In the summer of 1919, Italy participated in the Inter-Allied Games in Paris, on the occasion of the celebration of the Allied victory in World War I. This Italian team included five participants of the 1920 Summer Games in the following year and the rest played for the main team at one point. They comfortably beat Canada and the United States, which was the first time, official or otherwise, that Belgium faced a non-European team. However, a 1–4 loss to eventual champions Czechoslovakia on the opening day cost them a place in the final, although Belgium got their revenge by beating them in the final of the 1920 Olympics.

1922

1926

1959

1962

1966

1970

1974

1975

1978

1980

1982

1985

1986

1988

1990

1992

2000

2014

2017

References

External links
 List of Italy unofficial matches at italia1910.com

Unofficial
Lists of national association football team unofficial results